Erik Tepos Valtierra (born November 28, 1986 in Mexico City) is a professional squash player who represented Mexico. He reached a career-high world ranking of World No. 89 in July 2011.

References

External links 
 
 

1986 births
Living people
Mexican male squash players